Andrey Ivanavich Lyavonchyk (born 2 January 1977) is a retired Belarusian professional footballer. As of 2015, he works in administration of Shakhtyor Soligorsk.

Honours
Shakhtyor Soligorsk
Belarusian Premier League champion: 2005
Belarusian Cup winner: 2003–04, 2013–14

External links
 

1977 births
Living people
Belarusian footballers
Belarus under-21 international footballers
Belarusian Premier League players
FC Dinamo-Juni Minsk players
FC Dinamo Minsk players
FC Shakhtyor Soligorsk players
Association football midfielders
Footballers from Minsk